Ulysses Cuadra (born February 24, 1987) is an American actor, involved in cinema, television, and animation. English-language TV audiences may recognize him as the voice of Maurice "Twister" Rodriguez on the Nickelodeon animated series Rocket Power.

Career
Cuadra got started in the acting business at the age of ten years old.

He was the voice of Vaz on Clifford the Big Red Dog, and played Segura on Disney Channel movie Gotta Kick It Up!. Cuadra has also starred in numerous movies such as The End of Violence, Price of Glory, and Tortilla Soup.

Filmography

Film

Television

Video games

References

External links

Demo reel mp3 accessed January 2006

Living people
American people of Nicaraguan descent
American male voice actors
1987 births